Kenneth Farrand Simpson (May 4, 1895 – January 25, 1941) was a Republican member of the United States House of Representatives from New York.

Biography
Simpson was born in New York City on May 4, 1895, the son of Dr. William Kelly Simpson, a noted ear nose and throat specialist and Professor at Columbia University.  He graduated from The Hill School, and his senior year was notable for his success at convincing Theodore Roosevelt to speak at the school.  He graduated from Yale University in 1917, where he became a member of Phi Beta Kappa and was initiated into Skull and Bones, receiving the honor of "last man tapped."

Simpson served in World War I as a member of the 302nd Field Artillery Regiment, a unit of the 76th Division, attaining the rank of captain.  He later served as Commandant of the American School Detachment at the University of Aix-Marseilles.

Simpson graduated from Harvard Law School in 1922 and became an attorney.  He was active in the art world of post-war France, and worked with the French government to recover works stolen by the Germans during the war.  He also represented many artists and writers with whom he was friendly, including Pablo Picasso, Alexander Kerensky, Edmund Wilson, and Gertrude Stein. (Simpson's congressional campaign materials depicted him in his living room, leaning near a statue of Stein and smoking a pipe under a painting by Jean Lurçat.)

Simpson was an Assistant United States Attorney for the Southern District of New York from 1925 to 1927, and Chairman of the New York County Republican Committee from 1935 to 1940.  He was elected to represent New York on the Republican National Committee, and was a delegate to the 1936 and 1940 Republican National Conventions.  Simpson was a supporter of the Fusion Republicans who fought conservatives for control of the Republican Party in New York, and he formed alliances with Fiorello H. La Guardia and other liberal Republicans.  Simpson was an internationalist, and an early critic of Adolf Hitler and the U.S. business interests that were seen as sympathetic to the Nazis in the 1930s.

He was elected to Congress in November 1940.  Simpson was sworn in on January 3, 1941.  He died of a heart attack in New York City on January 25, after having served less than a month in office.  Simpson was buried at Hudson City Cemetery in Hudson, New York.

Family
In 1925 he married Helen Louise Knickerbacker Porter of Montclair, New Jersey.

The Simpsons had four children: Dr. William Kelly Simpson, a noted Egyptologist, Yale professor, and husband of Marilyn Milton Simpson; Mrs. Helen-Louise Simpson Seggerman; Mrs. Elizabeth Carroll Simpson Bennett of Washington, D.C.; and Sally Simpson French.

See also
 List of United States Congress members who died in office (1900–49)

References

External links 
 

Kenneth Farrand Simpson, Late a Representative from New York, U.S. Government Printing Office, 1942

1895 births
1941 deaths
The Hill School alumni
Yale University alumni
Harvard Law School alumni
Assistant United States Attorneys
New York (state) lawyers
United States Army personnel of World War I
Republican Party members of the United States House of Representatives from New York (state)
20th-century American politicians
20th-century American lawyers